Henry John Hey Lamb (3 May 1912 – 5 February 1993) was an English cricketer.  Lamb was a right-handed batsman who fielded occasionally as a wicket-keeper.  He was born at Warkton, Northamptonshire.

Career
Lamb made his first-class debut for Northamptonshire against Warwickshire in the 1934 County Championship.  He made 37 further first-class appearances, the last of which came against Somerset in the 1938 County Championship.  In his 38 first-class appearances, he scored 1,085 runs at an average of 16.95, with a high score of 91 not out.  This score, which was one of four first-class fifties he made, came against Essex in 1936.  He also captained Northamptonshire on occasion but was not the official club captain.

Death
He died at Kettering, Northamptonshire, on 5 February 1993.

References

External links
John Lamb at ESPNcricinfo
John Lamb at CricketArchive

1912 births
1993 deaths
People from North Northamptonshire
English cricketers
Northamptonshire cricketers